Lanare is a community and census-designated place (CDP) in Fresno County, California, United States. The population was 589 at the 2010 census, up from 540 at the 2000 census. The name is derived from Llewellyn A. Nares, the community developer. Lanare is currently served by the Riverdale Post Office, zip code 93656, and students attend public school in Riverdale.

Geography

History
The name honors  Llewellyn A. Nares, who owned the Rancho Laguna de Tache Mexican land grant.  A post office operated at Lanare from 1912 to 1925. The Laton and Western Railway was built to Lanare in 1911.

Demographics

2010
The 2010 United States Census reported that Lanare had a population of 589. The racial makeup of Lanare was 181 (30.7%) White, 57 (9.7%) African American, 5 (0.8%) Native American, 2 (0.3%) Asian, 0 (0.0%) Pacific Islander, 300 (50.9%) from other races, and 44 (7.5%) from two or more races. Hispanic or Latino of any race were 519 persons (88.1%).

The Census reported that 589 people (100% of the population) lived in households, 0 (0%) lived in non-institutionalized group quarters, and 0 (0%) were institutionalized.

There were 140 households, out of which 89 (63.6%) had children under the age of 18 living in them, 83 (59.3%) were opposite-sex married couples living together, 28 (20.0%) had a female householder with no husband present, 15 (10.7%) had a male householder with no wife present.  There were 14 (10.0%) unmarried opposite-sex partnerships, and 0 (0%) same-sex married couples or partnerships. 11 households (7.9%) were made up of individuals, and 5 (3.6%) had someone living alone who was 65 years of age or older. The average household size was 4.21.  There were 126 families (90.0% of all households); the average family size was 4.32.

The population was spread out, with 199 people (33.8%) under the age of 18, 62 people (10.5%) aged 18 to 24, 164 people (27.8%) aged 25 to 44, 115 people (19.5%) aged 45 to 64, and 49 people (8.3%) who were 65 years of age or older.  The median age was 28.5 years. For every 100 females, there were 95.0 males.  For every 100 females age 18 and over, there were 107.4 males.

The homeowner vacancy rate was 0%; the rental vacancy rate was 1.8%.  374 people (63.5% of the population) lived in owner-occupied housing units and 215 people (36.5%) lived in rental housing units.

2000
As of the census of 2000, there were 540 people, 126 households, and 105 families residing in the CDP. The racial makeup of the CDP was 25.56% White, 19.07% Black or African American, 0.93% Native American, 50.37% from other races, and 4.07% from two or more races.  76.30% of the population were Hispanic or Latino of any race.

There were 126 households, out of which 46.0% had children under the age of 18 living with them, 58.7% were married couples living together, 18.3% had a female householder with no husband present, and 15.9% were non-families. 11.1% of all households were made up of individuals, and 5.6% had someone living alone who was 65 years of age or older.  The average household size was 4.29 and the average family size was 4.52.

In the CDP, the population was spread out, with 33.9% under the age of 18, 13.7% from 18 to 24, 26.3% from 25 to 44, 16.5% from 45 to 64, and 9.6% who were 65 years of age or older.  The median age was 28 years. For every 100 females, there were 104.5 males.  For every 100 females age 18 and over, there were 107.6 males.

The median income for a household in the CDP was $26,375, and the median income for a family was $28,056. Males had a median income of $22,589 versus $16,250 for females. The per capita income for the CDP was $9,336.  About 23.1% of families and 29.1% of the population were below the poverty line, including 36.1% of those under age 18 and 32.8% of those age 65 or over.

References

External links

Census-designated places in Fresno County, California
Populated places established in 1911
Census-designated places in California